Alejandro Marcos López (born 29 February 2000) is a Spanish footballer who plays as a central defender.

Club career
Born in Badalona, Barcelona, Catalonia, Marcos joined FC Barcelona's La Masia in 2008, from CE Sant Gabriel. On 1 February 2019, he moved to Serie A side Torino, being assigned to the Primavera squad.

On 5 October 2020, after finishing his formation, Marcos signed a two-year contract with CD Castellón in Segunda División. He made his senior debut the following 6 January, coming on as a second-half substitute for Adrián Lapeña in a 0–2 home loss against CD Tenerife, for the season's Copa del Rey.

On 20 January 2021, Marcos was loaned to Segunda División B side UE Llagostera for the remainder of the season.

References

External links

2000 births
Living people
People from Badalona
Sportspeople from the Province of Barcelona
Spanish footballers
Footballers from Catalonia
Association football defenders
Primera Federación players
Segunda División B players
CD Castellón footballers
UE Costa Brava players
Torino F.C. players
Spanish expatriate footballers
Spanish expatriate sportspeople in Italy
Expatriate footballers in Italy